Lawrence Beesley (31 December 1877 – 14 February 1967) was an English science teacher, journalist and author who was a survivor of the sinking of .

Education
Beesley was educated at Derby School, where he was a scholar, and afterwards at Caius College, Cambridge, again as a scholar. He took a First Class degree in the Natural Science tripos in 1903.

Career
Beginning as a schoolmaster at Wirksworth Grammar School, he moved to Dulwich College, where he was a science master. In 1957 he was still teaching as Principal of the Northwood School of Coaching, Northwood, Middlesex.

RMS Titanic

Lifeboat No.13 was being launched on the Boat Deck, no women or children were in immediate sight, but it seemed there was room for more. As a result, Beesley was instructed to jump into the lifeboat just before it launched. He managed to survive a subsequent incident where Lifeboat No.15 nearly landed on top of No.13. The leading stoker of boiler room No.6, Fred Barrett, managed to cut the ropes connecting the boat to the falls at the last minute, and those in both boats emerged unharmed.

Later life and legacy
During the filming of A Night to Remember in 1958, Beesley famously gatecrashed the set during the sinking scene, hoping to 'go down with the ship'. However, he was spotted by the director, Roy Ward Baker, who vetoed this unscheduled appearance due to actors' union rules. These events are parodied in Julian Barnes' novel A History of the World in 10.5 Chapters, where Beesley makes a brief appearance as a fictional character.

Beesley was portrayed by actor David Warner (who later played fictional character Spicer Lovejoy in James Cameron's 1997 Titanic film) in the 1979 dramatisation of the voyage and sinking, S.O.S. Titanic. Beesley was also portrayed by Lawrence Bennett in 1999 musical stage adaptation Titanic. His son Alec married the author Dodie Smith, and he is the grandfather of New York Times science editor Nicholas Wade.

Publication
 The Loss of The SS Titanic: Its Story and Its Lessons, by One of the Survivors (June 1912)
 The Loss of The SS Titanic (new edition, Mariner Books, 2000)

References

 Lawrence Beesley at encyclopaedia-titanica.org
  Luck for Some - Titanic's Lifeboat 13 and its Passengers, pp 40-48, Lawrence Beesley.

External links
 
 
 
 The Loss of the S.S. Titanic
 The Loss of the S.S. Titanic in mobipocket format with images – bottom of page
 Lawrence Beesley Death Certificate on Titanic-Titanic.com 
 Lawrence Beesley: Celebrated Titanic Survivor by Peter Seddon 

1877 births
1967 deaths
Alumni of Gonville and Caius College, Cambridge
People educated at Derby School
People from Wirksworth
RMS Titanic survivors
Science teachers